Shehra is one of the 182 Legislative Assembly constituencies of Gujarat state in India. It is part of Panchmahal district.

List of segments
This assembly seat represents the following segments,

 Shehra Taluka
 Lunawada Taluka (Part) Villages – Kel, Dezar, Vaghoi, Chuladiya, Jetharibor, Gugaliya, Simlet
 Godhra Taluka (Part) Villages – Nadisar, Khajuri, Odidra, Jaliya, Dhanitra, Rinchhrota, Motal, Karsana, Velvad, Ichhapaginu Muvadu, Ratanpur (Kantdi), Kabirpur, Kabariya, Juni Dhari, Timba, Gotavipura, Pipaliya (Dhari), Moryo, Kankanpur, Moti Kantdi, Gothada

Member of Legislative Assembly
2002 - Jethabhai Ahir, Bharatiya Janata Party
2007 - Jethabhai Ahir, Bharatiya Janata Party
2012 - Jethabhai Ahir, Bharatiya Janata Party

Election candidate

2022

Election results

2017

2012

2007

2002

See also
 List of constituencies of Gujarat Legislative Assembly
 Gujarat Legislative Assembly
 Panchmahal district

References

External links
 

Assembly constituencies of Gujarat
Panchmahal district